Tim Edgell (born 8 August 1980) is a racing driver from New Zealand.

Career

V8 SuperTourers
In mid 2012, Edgell joined the all new V8SuperTourer category driving for his own team Edgell Performance Racing. It was a successful three rounds for the team, as the team managed to claim a pole position at the final meeting, at Ruapuna. Then in 2013, the team's first full season, they managed a race win with V8 Supercar driver Lee Holdsworth sharing the car with Edgell.

Racing record

Career summary

External links

1980 births
Living people
V8SuperTourer drivers